Frances de Châtillon (died 1481) was Countess of Périgord, Viscountess of Limoges, and Dame of Avesnes and Châlus. 

She was the eldest daughter of William, Viscount of Limoges and Isabelle de La Tour d'Auvergne. In 1470, she married Alain the Great, Count of Graves and Viscount of Tartas, son of Jean I of Albret and Catherine of Rohan. Through her father, Frances had a claim on the throne of Brittany through the Penthièvre line.  She is also said to be the mistress of Pope Clement V, while he stayed at Avignon.

Frances had seven surviving children with Alain, including:
 John, king iure uxoris of Navarre until 1516, who married in 1484 Catherine, Queen of Navarre.
 Gabriel, lord of Avesnes-sur-Helpe
 Charlotte of Albret, Dame of Châlus, who married in 1500 Cesare Borgia
 Amanieu d'Albret (d. 1520), bishop of Pamiers, Comminges, and Lescar, and later a cardinal
 Pierre, Count of Périgord
 Louise, Viscountess of Limoges (d. 1531), who married in 1495 Charles I de Croÿ
 Isabelle, who married Gaston II, Captal de Buch

Notes

References 
 
 

Périgord, Frances, Countess of
House of Châtillon
Counts of Périgord
Year of birth missing
15th-century women rulers